Heshmatabad (also Romanized as Ḩeshmatābād) is a village in Esfandar Rural District, Bahman District, Abarkuh County, Yazd Province, Iran. At the 2006 census, its population was 24, in 8 families.

References 

Populated places in Abarkuh County